Srednja Vas is a village in the Municipality of Semič in Slovenia. The area is part of the historical region of Lower Carniola. The municipality is now included in the Southeast Slovenia Statistical Region. 

The local church is dedicated to Saints Phillip and James and belongs to the Parish of Črmošnjice. It dates to the 18th century.

References

External links
Srednja Vas at Geopedia
Pre–World War II list of oeconyms and family names in Srednja Vas

Populated places in the Municipality of Semič